Agia Eirini ("Saint Irene"), is an uninhabited Greek islet near the port of Makry Gialos, in the Libyan Sea, close to the southern coast of eastern Crete. Administratively it lies within the Makry Gialos municipal unit of Lasithi.

See also
List of islands of Greece

References

Landforms of Lasithi
Uninhabited islands of Crete
Islands of Greece